The Kuzitrin River (Kurritqiun in Inupiaq) is a stream,  long, on the Seward Peninsula in the U.S. state of Alaska. The basin drains via the bay of Port Clarence to the Bering Sea. Kuzitrin tributaries include the Noxapaga, Kougarok, Kruzgamepa (Pilgrim), and Kugruk rivers.

The river's name, from Inupiaq, was recorded in 1900 by the United States Geological Survey. The United States Board on Geographic Names officially adopted the name in 1950.

There is one former village site on the lower Kuzitrin, at Mary's Igloo. The village is abandoned but is still used for subsistence activities by people from the nearby village of Teller.

See also
List of rivers of Alaska

References

Rivers of Nome Census Area, Alaska
Rivers of the Seward Peninsula
Drainage basins of the Bering Sea
Rivers of Alaska
Rivers of Unorganized Borough, Alaska